Mizan Dam or Band-e-Mizan, is a historic dam from the Sassanid era and a part of Shushtar Historical Hydraulic System, located in the island city Shushtar, Khuzestan Province, Iran. Mizan Dam was registered on UNESCO's list of World Heritage Sites in 2009 and is Iran's 10th cultural heritage site to be registered on the United Nations' list together with the 12 other historical bridges, dams, canals, and buildings as Shushtar Historical Hydraulic System.

History 
As in its present form, it dates from the 3rd century CE, probably on older bases from the 5th century BC. The dam was built by Roman soldiers and engineers who were taken into captivity along with Valerian (emperor) (reign 253–260 CE) after his defeat by Shapur I (241-272 CE).

Function 
Mizan Dam is located upstream of a manmade canal called Gargar which was dug in order to divert water from the Karun River. The dam regulates water for Gargar (a tributary stream branched from Karun) and this way, Mizan is considered a regulatory dam

Material 
The elemental materials of this site are stone, Saruj mortar and sandstone in foundation that all of them have maintained their authenticity, and there aren't any interventions. But there are differences in some part of site due to different restoration periods.

Threats 
Due to the location and nature of Mizan Dam, this dam is sometimes submerged. Severe flooding has occurred during previous decades which affected the dam.

Sources 

Dams in Khuzestan Province
World Heritage Sites in Iran
Buildings and structures in Khuzestan Province